Acidovorax defluvii is a Gram-negative soil bacterium.

External links
Type strain of Acidovorax defluvii at BacDive -  the Bacterial Diversity Metadatabase

Comamonadaceae
Bacteria described in 1999